Darrell Eugene Armstrong (born June 22, 1968) is a former American professional basketball player, who played 14 seasons in the National Basketball Association.  He is currently an assistant coach for the NBA's Dallas Mavericks, who won the championship in the 2010–11 season.

Early life
Armstrong was born in Gastonia, North Carolina and graduated from Ashbrook High School of Gastonia in 1986. At Ashbrook, Armstrong was a punter and wide receiver on the football team and began playing basketball as a senior. Armstrong then attended Fayetteville State University, a Division II college in Fayetteville, North Carolina and part of the Central Intercollegiate Athletic Association (CIAA) conference, and joined the football team as a walk-on placekicker. Armstrong played football for the 1986 and 1987 seasons and twice kicked school-record 48-yard field goals. In 1988, Armstrong joined the Fayetteville State basketball team and would play three seasons under coach Jeff Capel II. In his senior season of 1990–91, Armstrong played 24 games and averaged 16.4 points, 3.6 rebounds, and 4.7 assists. Armstrong was the CIAA Slam Dunk champion in 1990 and a first-team All-CIAA selection in 1991.

Minor and international leagues (1991–1995)
Armstrong was not selected in the 1991 NBA draft and began his career with the Atlanta Eagles (renamed Trojans in 1994) of the United States Basketball League (USBL) in 1991. Armstrong was named to the USBL All-Defensive team three consecutive seasons from 1992 to 1994, was a second-team All-USBL selection in 1992, and first-team All-USBL selection in 1993 and 1994.

In October 1992, Armstrong signed with the Capital Region Pontiacs of the Continental Basketball Association (CBA). Armstrong later played for the South Georgia Blues of the Global Basketball Association until the team folded in 1993. After playing for the Blues, Armstrong returned to Gastonia. He volunteered at Ashbrook High School as an assistant basketball coach and worked the night shift at a yarn factory.

Armstrong signed with Pezoporikos Larnaca of Cyprus in 1993. He averaged 32.0 points and 8.0 assists and won Player of the Year honors.

For the 1994–95 season, Armstrong played for Coren Ourense of the Spanish Liga ACB and averaged 24.6 points, 4.5 rebounds, and 2.5 assists. He was a ULEB All-Star in 1994.

NBA career

Orlando Magic
Armstrong first signed with the NBA as a free agent for the Orlando Magic in late 1994–95, playing in the last 3 games of the regular season with 10 points in 8 minutes of action including a spectacular one-handed reverse windmill dunk late in a blowout vs the Indiana Pacers in his 2nd game. In 95–96 he played just 41 minutes in 13 games, scoring 42 points total; despite his limited minutes, he participated in the 1996 Slam Dunk Contest. He was inactive after February.

He saw 67 games in his first full season on the roster in 1996–97, averaging 6 points per game in 15 minutes per game off the bench. Armstrong won the NBA Sixth Man of the Year Award and the NBA Most Improved Player Award in 1999, thus becoming the first player in NBA history to win both awards simultaneously. In a 1999 game against the Philadelphia 76ers, Armstrong stole an inbounds pass and streaked to the other end of the court for a game winning layup as time expired. He subsequently became the starting point guard for the Magic. His career year was in 1999–00, averaging 16.2 ppg in 31 mpg. 

On February 14, 2001, Armstrong recorded 22 points and a career-high 16 assists in a 114–101 win over the LA Clippers.

During his nine years in Orlando, the team never posted a losing record, making the post-season seven times.

On July 7, 2003, Armstrong was arrested after an incident outside an Orlando night club. He was subsequently charged with resisting arrest and assaulting a police officer, but the case was eventually dismissed.

New Orleans Hornets
During the 2003 off-season, Armstrong signed with the New Orleans Hornets as a free agent.

Dallas Mavericks
He was traded by the Hornets to the Dallas Mavericks in exchange for Dan Dickau and a second round draft pick on December 3, 2004.
On December 19, 2005, while he was still with the Dallas Mavericks, Armstrong was fined $1,000 for grabbing a microphone before a Mavericks game against the Minnesota Timberwolves at the American Airlines Center and yelling "How 'bout those Redskins!" Only a few hours prior, the Cowboys had been routed by the Redskins 35–7. Armstrong was raised in North Carolina as a Redskins fan.

Indiana Pacers
After appearing in the 2006 NBA Finals with the Mavericks, he was traded to the Indiana Pacers in exchange for guard Anthony Johnson in July 2006. Armstrong was released by the Pacers on October 1, 2007.

New Jersey Nets
After being released by the Pacers, Armstrong signed with the New Jersey Nets after clearing waivers. He appeared in 50 games in 2007–08, averaging 2.5 ppg in 11.0 minutes, and buried three 3-pointers in his final appearance of the season.

Player profile
Despite his short height, Armstrong had the ability to dunk. He accidentally completed a reverse layup in the 1996 Slam Dunk Contest, which was deemed the worst dunk in the competition's history by Kenny Smith. Subsequently, he was awarded last place in the contest, and was never invited to compete again.

Coaching career
On January 26, 2009, the Dallas Mavericks hired Armstrong to be assistant coach for player development. Armstrong helped coach the Mavericks to win the 2011 NBA Finals.

NBA career statistics

Regular season

|-
| align="left" | 1994–95
| align="left" | Orlando
| 3 || 0 || 2.7 || .375 || .333 || 1.000 || .3 || 1.0 || .3 || .0 || 3.3
|-
| align="left" | 1995–96
| align="left" | Orlando
| 13 || 0 || 3.2 || .500 || .500 || 1.000 || .2 || .4 || .5 || .0 || 3.2
|-
| align="left" | 1996–97
| align="left" | Orlando
| 67 || 0 || 15.1 || .383 || .304 || .868 || 1.1 || 2.6 || .9 || .1 || 6.1
|-
| align="left" | 1997–98
| align="left" | Orlando
| 48 || 17 || 25.8 || .411 || .368 || .854 || 3.3 || 4.9 || 1.2 || .1 || 9.2
|-
| align="left" | 1998–99
| align="left" | Orlando
| 50 || 15 || 30.0 || .441 || .365 || .904 || 3.6 || 6.7 || 2.2 || .1 || 13.8
|-
| align="left" | 1999–00
| align="left" | Orlando
| 82 || 82 || 31.6 || .433 || .340 || .911 || 3.3 || 6.1 || 2.1 || .1 || 16.2
|-
| align="left" | 2000–01
| align="left" | Orlando
| 75 || 75 || 36.9 || .412 || .355 || .884 || 4.6 || 7.0 || 1.8 || .2 || 15.9
|-
| align="left" | 2001–02
| align="left" | Orlando
| 82 || 79 || 33.3 || .419 || .349 || .888 || 3.9 || 5.5 || 1.9 || .1 || 12.4
|-
| align="left" | 2002–03
| align="left" | Orlando
| 82 || 23 || 28.7 || .409 || .336 || .878 || 3.6 || 3.9 || 1.6 || .2 || 9.4
|-
| align="left" | 2003–04
| align="left" | New Orleans
| 79 || 22 || 28.4 || .395 || .315 || .854 || 2.9 || 3.9 || 1.7 || .2 || 10.6
|-
| align="left" | 2004–05
| align="left" | New Orleans
| 14 || 9 || 29.4 || .333 || .243 || .905 || 3.4 || 4.6 || 1.1 || .1 || 10.1
|-
| align="left" | 2004–05
| align="left" | Dallas
| 52 || 7 || 11.1 || .305 || .268 || .830 || 1.3 || 2.2 || .6 || .1 || 2.3
|-
| align="left" | 2005–06
| align="left" | Dallas
| 62 || 2 || 10.0 || .336 || .229 || .786 || 1.3 || 1.4 || .4 || .1 || 2.1
|-
| align="left" | 2006–07
| align="left" | Indiana
| 81 || 4 || 15.7 || .414 || .336 || .785 || 1.7 || 2.4 || .9 || .1 || 5.6
|-
| align="left" | 2007–08
| align="left" | New Jersey
| 50 || 2 || 11.0 || .364 || .333 || .667 || 1.3 || 1.5 || .6 || .0 || 2.5
|- class="sortbottom"
| style="text-align:center;" colspan="2"| Career
| 840 || 337 || 23.7 || .409 || .334 || .871 || 2.7 || 4.0 || 1.4 || .1 || 9.2

Playoffs

|-
| align="left" | 1997
| align="left" | Orlando
| 5 || 0 || 28.6 || .476 || .333 || .846 || 4.2 || 3.4 || 1.6 || .2 || 11.4
|-
| align="left" | 1999
| align="left" | Orlando
| 4 || 4 || 40.8 || .370 || .375 || 1.000 || 5.0 || 6.3 || 2.2 || .0 || 14.8
|-
| align="left" | 2001
| align="left" | Orlando
| 4 || 4 || 41.8 || .378 || .368 || .923 || 5.5 || 4.8 || 2.0 || .5 || 13.3
|-
| align="left" | 2002
| align="left" | Orlando
| 4 || 4 || 39.5 || .476 || .235 || .810 || 2.8 || 3.3 || 1.2 || .0 || 15.3
|-
| align="left" | 2003
| align="left" | Orlando
| 7 || 1 || 32.3 || .455 || .333 || .909 || 2.4 || 3.7 || .9 || .0 || 9.4
|-
| align="left" | 2004
| align="left" | New Orleans
| 7 || 0 || 21.4 || .235 || .200 || 1.000 || 2.1 || 2.3 || .9 || .0 || 3.4
|-
| align="left" | 2005
| align="left" | Dallas
| 9 || 0 || 7.3 || .500 || .250 || .000 || .4 || 1.0 || .3 || .2 || 2.0
|-
| align="left" | 2006
| align="left" | Dallas
| 11 || 0 || 4.3 || .200 || .000 || 1.000 || .6 || .2 || .3 || .1 || .7
|- class="sortbottom"
| style="text-align:center;" colspan="2"| Career
| 51 || 13 || 22.0 || .398 || .287 || .900 || 2.3 || 2.5 || .9 || .1 || 6.8

References

External links
NBA.com profile
ESPN.com profile

1968 births
Living people
American expatriate basketball people in Cyprus
American expatriate basketball people in Spain
American men's basketball players
Basketball coaches from North Carolina
Basketball players from New Jersey
Basketball players from Charlotte, North Carolina
Capital Region Pontiacs players
Club Ourense Baloncesto players
Dallas Mavericks assistant coaches
Dallas Mavericks players
Fayetteville State Broncos basketball players
Fayetteville State Broncos football players
Indiana Pacers players
Liga ACB players
New Jersey Nets players
New Orleans Hornets players
Orlando Magic players
People from Gastonia, North Carolina
Point guards
Sportspeople from Charlotte, North Carolina
Undrafted National Basketball Association players
United States Basketball League players